A cupule is a small structure shaped like a cup, including:

 In archeology, rock cupules are circular man-made hollows on the surface of a large rock or a rock slab
 On a smaller artifact they are called a cupstone.
 In botany: the base of an acorn, see calybium and cupule.
 In entomology, a sucker on the feet of some flies.

See also
 Cupula (disambiguation)
 Copula (disambiguation)
 Cupul